Vernonia alleizettei is a species of flowering plant in the aster family, Asteraceae. It is endemic to Madagascar.

Four varieties are accepted:
Vernonia alleizettei var. alleizettei –  isotype collected in 1948
Vernonia alleizettei var. hirtella
Vernonia alleizettei var. moramangensis
Vernonia alleizettei var. rienanensis – holotype was collected in 1924 at "Centre (confins Est), haute vallée de la Rienana (bassin du Matitanana)"

References

alleizettei
Endemic flora of Madagascar
Taxa named by Jean-Henri Humbert